Santo, Sam and Ed's Total Football was an Australian association football themed comedy television show, hosted by Santo Cilauro, Sam Pang and Ed Kavalee. The series launched in 2013, screening each Tuesday on Fox Sports from October to May, in line with the network's A-League coverage. In October 2015, it was announced that the show would not return for a third season.

The show focused on both the A-League and a range of global football leagues, and included a variety of segments and interviews throughout each episode.

Hosts
Santo Cilauro
Sam Pang
Ed Kavalee

Regular contributors
David Davutovic
Neroli Meadows
Rob Sitch
Michael Zappone

See also

Santo, Sam and Ed's Cup Fever!
Santo, Sam and Ed's Sports Fever!

References

External links
 Official website
 

Fox Sports (Australian TV network) original programming
2013 Australian television series debuts
2015 Australian television series endings
English-language television shows
Australian sports television series
Australian comedy television series
A-League Men on television
Australian Broadcasting Corporation original programming